The Kenyah languages are a group of half a dozen or so closely related languages spoken by the Kenyah peoples of Borneo. They are:
 Kenyah proper (a dialect cluster, incl. Madang), Sebob, Tutoh (Long Wat), Wahau Kenyah, Uma’ Lung / Uma’ Lasan.

Ethnologue says that the Punan–Nibong languages are related to Uma’ Lasan, Glottolog that they are outside the Kenyah languages.

Classification
Soriente (2008) proposes a Kayan-Kenyah grouping.
Proto–Kayan-Kenyah
Kenyah
Upper Pujungan
Usun Apau
Penan
West Penan
East Penan
Kayanic
Lebu Kulit
Mboh
Ngorek
Kayan

However, Smith (2015) rejects Soriente's grouping, and argues that Kenyah and Kayan are separate groups. Smith (2015) proposes the following classification.
Proto-Kenyah
Highland
Highland A dialects: Lepo Gah, Lepo Sawa, Lepo Laang, Lepo Baha, Lepo Maut, Lepo Ké, Bakung, Lepo Ndang
Highland B dialects: Lepo Tau, Badeng, Uma Lasan, Uma Alim, Òma Lóngh
Lowland
Western Lowland dialects: Lebo' Vo'
Eastern Lowland dialects: Lebu Kulit, Lebuq Timai, Uma Pawa, Uma Ujok,  Uma Kelap/Kelep
Penan-Sebop
Penan
Sebop

This classification of Kenyah languages was updated in a second publication, "Penan, Sebop, and Kenyah internal classification". There, it was shown that Penan and Sebop subgroup specifically with the Western-Lowland branch of Lowland Kenyah. This subgrouping was repeated in the dissertation, "The languages of Borneo: a comprehensive classification".
Proto-Kenyah
Highland
Highland A dialects: Lepo Gah, Lepo Sawa, Lepo Laang, Lepo Baha, Lepo Maut, Lepo Ké, Bakung, Lepo Ndang
Highland B dialects: Lepo Tau, Badeng, Uma Lasan, Uma Alim, Òma Lóngh
Lowland
Western Lowland dialects: Lebo' Vo', Eastern Penan, Western Penan, Sebop
Eastern Lowland dialects: Lebu Kulit, Lebuq Timai, Uma Pawa, Uma Ujok,  Uma Kelap/Kelep

Austroasiatic influence
Kaufman (2018) notes that many Proto-Kenyah words (Smith 2017) are of likely Austroasiatic origin, including the following (Note: The Austroasiatic branch reconstructions are from Paul Sidwell's reconstructions).

 *saləŋ ‘black’ (cf. Proto-Palaungic *laŋ; Proto-Bahnaric *sla(ː)ŋ ‘clear, transparent’)
 *makaŋ ‘brave’
 *dəŋ ‘deaf’ (cf. Proto-Katuic *tuŋ; Mon daŋ)
 *pətat ‘divorce’ (cf. Mon )
 *naʔ ‘give’ (cf. Proto-South-Bahnaric *ʔaːn; Khmu ʔan)
 *biləŋ ‘green’
 *mə-bʰuh ‘help, assist’
 *laʔu ‘hungry’
 *adaŋ ‘must’
 *iəŋ ‘mosquito’
 *kabiŋ ‘left (side)’
 *pilaw ‘smooth’ (cf. Proto-Katuic *phiil)
 *biʔən ‘time’ (cf. Proto-Palaungic *bən ‘(future) time’)
 *nəmbam ‘tomorrow’
 *ait ‘sand’
 *luaŋ ‘seed’
 *su ‘grandchild’ (cf. Proto-Palaungic *cuʔ)

Vo words of likely Austroasiatic origin include:

 ɟen ‘bring’
 pikəp ‘narrow’
 mamoŋ ‘pregnant’
 imaʔ ‘rain’ (cf. Proto-Austroasiatic *gmaʔ)
 lañaʔ ‘fast/quick’ (cf. Proto-Vietic *m-laɲ; Proto-North-Bahnaric *raɲ)
 məɲon ‘sit’ (cf. Proto-Palaungic *-ɟɔn)
 ʄap ‘ten’ (cf. Khmer  < Chinese?)
 sah ‘seed’ (cf. Proto-Palaungic *ʄak)

References